"Heart of Stone" is a song written by Andy Hill and Pete Sinfield for the band Bucks Fizz in 1988, and recorded by the band at Abbey Road Studios in London. The following year it was recorded by Cher as the title track of her album of the same name.

Bucks Fizz version
"Heart of Stone" was originally recorded by Bucks Fizz and released as a single in 1988. It was the group's 20th single and their last one to chart, reaching number 50 on the UK Singles Chart in November 1988. The single was accompanied by a Promotional video of the group performing the song inside and outside of a country mansion. The mansion was owned by Robin Gibb of the Bee Gees who claimed that his house was haunted by the ghost of a gardener who enjoys playing pranks on the Gibb family. As a reference to this, a gardener was fleetingly seen in some shots.

Soon after this, the group released The Story so Far, a greatest hits album, which featured "Heart of Stone" as the only new track (at a shortened 3:58). Bucks Fizz recorded several other songs at this time, but due to the low chart position of this single, went unreleased until they were unearthed for a compilation album of unreleased Bucks Fizz songs, The Lost Masters in 2006. Member Cheryl Baker later recorded a lead vocal for the track which was also included on The Lost Masters collection. Journalist Mark Frith said that the song was "a gutsy pop classic".

Track listing
 7-inch single
 "Heart of Stone"  (4.22)
 "Here's Looking at You" (5.49)

 12-inch single
 "Heart of Stone" (4.29)
 "Here's Looking at You" (5.49)
 "My Camera Never Lies" (3.43)

Cher version

"Heart of Stone" served as the fourth North American and third European single release from American singer and actress Cher's 19th studio album, Heart of Stone (1989). The music video shows Cher in a dark room with old clips of herself projected onto screens in the background. It was shot in the first week of 1990. It entered the top 20 in the United States and barely missed the top 40 in the UK.

Critical reception
Bill Coleman from Billboard wrote, "Fave track from diva's current platinum opus is an acoustic-powered rocker destined to follow the top 10 success of its predecessors." The Daily Vault's Mark Millan named "Heart of Stone" one of Cher's "finest moments to date", adding, "The lyrics are a tad confusing because it's half social commentary and half autobiographical, but it's a great soulful pop song." Terry Staunton  from NME said, "Cher is living proof that a dual acting/singing career can work. Miles better than the dreary "Just Like Jesse James". Peter Asher's production bubbles and squeaks with the excitement he completely failed to achieve on the last 10,000 Maniacs LP."

Live performances
Cher performed the song on the following concert tours:
 Heart of Stone Tour (omitted from some dates)
 Do You Believe? Tour (dropped from the show's setlist after the first few shows)
 The Farewell Tour (sung on the first leg, the second leg and the final two shows of the tour)
 Dressed to Kill Tour (omitted from some dates)

Track listing
 US 7-inch single
 "Heart of Stone" (Heartbeat version – faded) – 4:01
 "All Because of You" – 3:29

 US cassette single
 "Heart of Stone" (CHR version) – 3:50
 "All Because of You" – 3:29

 European 7-inch and cassette single
 "Heart of Stone" (remix) – 4:16
 "All Because of You" – 3:30

 European 12-inch and CD single
 "Heart of Stone" (remix) – 4:16
 "All Because of You" – 3:30
 "Working Girl" – 3:57

Personnel
 Drums: Carlos Vega
 Percussion: Michael Fisher
 Bass: Lee Sklar
 Guitars: Waddy Wachtel, Mike Landau, Andrew Gold
 Keyboards: Robbie Buchanan, Jon Gilutin

Charts

Release history

References

1980s ballads
1988 singles
1990 singles
Bucks Fizz songs
Cher songs
Music videos directed by Marty Callner
Songs with lyrics by Peter Sinfield
Songs written by Andy Hill (composer)
Rock ballads
Song recordings produced by Peter Asher
1988 songs
RCA Records singles
Articles containing video clips